Otto Tetens (26 September 1865, Rendsburg, Germany – 15 February 1945, Teplitz-Schönau) was a German natural scientist with an astronomy background.

Life 
Tetens was the son of a high ranked police officer in Schleswig, Northern Germany. He went to several universities for different natural science topics in Tübingen, Munich, Berlin and Kiel.
After this period, he worked at the private astronomy observatory of Miklos Konkly-Thege in Ogyalla in Hungary.
In 1891 he got his Doctor degree of Natural Science. He then worked at different institutes in astronomy such as the Deutsche Seewarte, Hamburg, and the Observatory of Strasbourg.

From 1902 to 1905 Otto Tetens worked for the Royal Society of Science of Göttingen on a climate project in Samoa, then a German colony. He founded the Apia Observatory in June 1902 at Mulinuu near the main town of Apia. After his time in Samoa, he went back to Germany and Göttingen to work on his reports for the previous three years and then took an occupation at the Royal Astronomy Observatory in Kiel, Germany.

After retirement he moved to Bad Saarow, some 10 km away from Lindenberg and lived at his house in Seestrasse at the Lake Scharmützelsee.

He died in 1945 while staying at a sanatorium in Teplitz-Schönau. His wife Dorothee Heimrod, daughter of the Council of the United States in Samoa and later Switzerland, moved back to the USA in 1947 and died 1962 in New York City.

Photography by Otto Tetens 
During his time in Samoa, Otto Tetens took a great number of valuable and interesting photos of his time and the people of Samoa. These photos were exhibited in Germany and Samoa in 2004 and 2005.

The photo with the paramount chief Josefo Mataafa shows the way Otto Tetens was living in Samoa: as a partner on the same level, with strong adoption of Samoan culture and habits. His houses for work and living at the Mulinuu observatory were built as Samoan fales, not as German wood houses. The photo was taken in 1904 by Otto Tetens.

References

Further reading
Christiane Niggemann (Hrsg.): Samoa 1904. Menschen, Landschaft und Kultur im Süd-Pazifik vor Hundert Jahren. Fotos von Otto Tetens in Samoa 1902–1905. Arkana-Verlag, Göttingen 2004 (Germany), 

Felix Lühning. "...Eine ausnehmende Zierde und Vortheil". Geschichte der Kieler Universitätssternwarte und ihrer Vorgängerinnen 1770–1950. Zwei Jahrhunderte Arbeit und Forschung zwischen Grenzen und Möglichkeiten. Neumünster: Wachholtz, 2007 (Habilitationsschrift, Fachbereich Mathematik der Universität Hamburg 2002).

Hans Steinhagen: Lindenberger Himmelsjäger – Miniaturen rund um das Observatorium. Arkana-Verlag, Göttingen 2011 (Germany), S. 70 ff

External links
Fotos von Otto Tetens in Samoa 1902-1905. Samoa 1904. Museum Bochum.  
Photos by Otto Tetens in Samoa 1902-1905. Samoa 1905. Exhibition in Apia. 

20th-century German astronomers
German meteorologists
1865 births
1945 deaths
People from the Duchy of Schleswig
People from Rendsburg
19th-century German astronomers